The Depretis VII government of Italy held office from 29 June 1885 until 4 April 1887, a total of 644 days, or 1 year, 9 months and 6 days.

Government parties
The government was composed by the following parties:

Composition

References

Italian governments
1885 establishments in Italy
1887 disestablishments in Italy